The Last Kingdom is a British historical fiction television series based on Bernard Cornwell's The Saxon Stories series of novels. The first season debuted on BBC America on 10 October 2015, and BBC Two on 22 October 2015. The second season premiered on 16 March 2017 and was a joint venture between the BBC and Netflix. Netflix bought the rights exclusively for the third season, which was released on 19 November 2018. This was followed by a fourth season, which was released on 26 April 2020.

A fifth season was confirmed in July 2020; it was later announced that it would be the show's last. It was released on March 9, 2022.

Series overview

Episodes

Season 1 (2015)

Season 2 (2017)

Season 3 (2018)

Season 4 (2020)

Season 5 (2022)

References

External links

 The Last Kingdom Official Website
 The Last Kingdom at BBC America
 The Last Kingdom at BBC Two
 The Last Kingdom on Netflix
 
 
 

Lists of British drama television series episodes
Lists of American drama television series episodes